The Pearls were an English 1970s girl vocal duo from Liverpool, England, featuring Lyn Cornell and Ann Simmons (née O'Brien). They released a total of 12 singles, the most successful being "Guilty", which reached No. 10 in the UK Singles Chart in June 1974. Various Pearls singles were released around the world with different catalogue numbers and sometimes different labels . They had releases throughout Europe and in the Far East, USA, Canada, New Zealand and Australia .

Career
Cornell and Simmons were originally part of The Vernons Girls, and with assistance from the record producer, Phil Swern, formed The Pearls in 1972. After her time with the Vernons, Cornell, who had dated Adam Faith, became a solo singer, and had minor success with "Never on a Sunday" and a Christmas song, "The Angel and the Stranger". Cornell's 1960 recording of "Never on Sunday" reached No. 30 in the UK Singles Chart.

The Pearls' first records were cover versions of the 1960s songs "Third Finger, Left Hand" (a b-side from the Martha and the Vandellas hit single, "Jimmy Mack") and The Ronettes, "You Came, You Saw, You Conquered". These records were issued by Bell Records. However, the vocal on the first single issued by The Pearls was not performed by Cornell and Simmons. It was the duo Sue and Sunny – Sue Glover and Sunny Leslie – who sang on "Third Finger Left Hand" as stated on The Pearls compilation album. Sue and Sunny could not front The Pearls when the record was released, because they had previous contractual obligations. There were a total of seven singles issued on the Bell label.

The Pearls' original songs included "Let's Make Love Again", "Doctor Love" and "Wizard of Love" among others (although these all failed to chart).  They had more success with another original song which was their only non-cover to chart "Guilty", co-written by Ron Roker, which became a UK Top 10 success in 1974. Their previously unreleased cover of The Everly Brothers, "Bye Bye Love" appeared on their compilation album, A String of Pearls (see discography).

In 1975 The Pearls changed label to Private Stock releasing three singles over the next two years. The first release "Lead Us Not into Temptation" was an original song but the next two were covers. "The Cheater" which had been a big mid sixties success stateside for Bob Kuban was a popular play on the Northern soul circuit, and their last single for Private Stock was a disco version of "I'll See You in My Dreams", which was also issued in the United States as a 10" D.J. single.

Both Cornell and Simmons were also session and backing singers, as detailed in the liner notes of their compilation album. They belonged at various stages of their careers to other groups. Cornell who had been a solo singer both prior to joining The Vernons Girls and after, was also a member of The Breakaways, The Ladybirds, The Chucks, The Carefrees and The Raindrops. She also sang and toured with the James Last Orchestra during the entire time she was a member of The Pearls and beyond . Simmons, as well as her time with The Vernons Girls, was a member of The Redmond Twins, The Breakaways, The Ladybirds and The Anita Kerr Singers during her career.

Cornell married session musician Andy White; the drummer on the album version of The Beatles' first hit, "Love Me Do". Cornell and White later divorced and she now lives in London.

Discography

Singles

Albums
A String of Pearls (CD July 2005 by Rev-Ola Records)

  "Lead Us Not into Temptation" – (Roger Greenaway, Tony Macaulay) 2:52
  "Third Finger, Left Hand" – (Holland–Dozier–Holland) 2:31
  "Yo Yo" – (Chris Andrews) 2:45
  "You Came, You Saw, You Conquered" – (Irwin Levine, Phil Spector, Toni Wine) 2:39
  "Guilty" – (Ron Roker, Gerry Shury) 3:03
  "Sing Out to Me" – (Johnny Arthey, Phil Swern) 2:51
  "Pass It On" – (Johnny Arthey, Phil Swern) 2:26
  "You Are Everything" – (Thom Bell, Linda Creed) 2:40
  "She Say, He Say" – (Johnny Arthey, Phil Swern) 2:24
  "Deeper in Love with You" – (Johnny Arthey, Phil Swern) 2:48
  "Wizard of Love" – (Gerry Shury, Phil Swern) 3:25
  "I'll Say It Over Again" – (Johnny Arthey, Phil Swern) 2:25
  "Doctor Love" – (Biddu) 2:35
  "Playing Around" – (Johnny Arthey, Phil Swern) 2:26
  "Love Sensation" – (Biddu, Phil Swern) 3:13
  "The Cheater" – (Mike Krenski) 2:52
  "I'll See You in My Dreams" – (Isham Jones, Gus Kahn) 3:02
  "Let's Make Love Again" – (Mel Taggart, Ray Roberts) 3:43
  "I'm Gonna Steal Your Heart Away" – (Biddu, Phil Swern) 3:20
  "We Can Make It Baby" – (Lyn Cornell, Richard Hewson) 2:13
  "Double Trouble" – (Gerry Shury, Phil Swern) 2:56
  "One in the Eye for Love" – (Gerry Shury, Phil Swern) 3:29
  "Bye Bye Love" – (Felice and Boudleaux Bryant) 2:07
  "A Lover's Concerto" – (Sandy Linzer, Denny Randell) 2:43

The CD in one of a number of errors lists track 18 as "Pearly" the instrumental B-side of "I'll See You in My Dreams". "Pearly" was credited to "The Pearls Orchestra". The track is actually "Let's Make Love Again" which the liner notes said was unobtainable. The other instrumental also not included on the CD was the B-side of the first single "Third Finger Left Hand" and titled "Little Lady Love Me". This track was credited to "The Rhythm of the Pearls". 

The final two tracks were available on this CD for the first time.

Notes

References

Bell Records artists
English pop music duos
English pop girl groups
Musical groups established in 1972
Musical groups disestablished in 1978